Károly Palotai (11 September 1935 – 3 February 2018) was a Hungarian association football player and referee. He was an Olympic Gold winner as a player before turning to refereeing. He was a referee at three World Cup tournaments and officiated in two European Cup finals.

Playing career
He was a successful player with Győri ETO FC and also won a gold medal at the football tournament of the 1964 Olympic Games in Tokyo, when Hungary defeated Czechoslovakia in the final with 2–1.

Refereeing career
Károly Palotai was a referee in the FIFA World Cups 1974, 1978 and 1982, as well as in the European Championship 1980 and the 1972 Olympic Games in Munich and the 1976 Olympic Games in Montreal. In addition, he officiated the finals of the European Champions' Cup 1976 between Bayern Munich and AS Saint-Etienne and 1981 between Real Madrid and Liverpool FC, the European Cup Winners' Cup final of 1979 between FC Barcelona and Fortuna Düsseldorf and the first leg of the finals of the UEFA Cup 1974–75 between Borussia Mönchengladbach and FC Twente Enschede.

References

External links
 
 
 
 Referee profile at WorldFootball.net

1935 births
2018 deaths
Hungarian footballers
Olympic footballers of Hungary
Olympic gold medalists for Hungary
Olympic medalists in football
Footballers at the 1964 Summer Olympics
Medalists at the 1964 Summer Olympics
Olympic football referees
Hungarian football referees
FIFA World Cup referees
1982 FIFA World Cup referees
1978 FIFA World Cup referees
1974 FIFA World Cup referees
UEFA Euro 1980 referees
Hungarian expatriate footballers
Hungarian expatriate sportspeople in West Germany
Expatriate footballers in West Germany
Association football midfielders
Békéscsaba 1912 Előre footballers
Győri ETO FC players
People from Békéscsaba
Freiburger FC players
Sportspeople from Békés County